Akonnedi is a traditional shrine located in Larteh in the Eastern Region of Ghana

References

Shrines
Religious buildings and structures in Africa
Buildings and structures in Ghana
Eastern Region (Ghana)